Dame Rachel Susan Griffith  (born 16 May 1963) is a British-American academic and educator. She is professor of economics at the University of Manchester and a research director at the Institute for Fiscal Studies.

Griffith was president of the European Economic Association for 2015, making her the first woman to hold the position. She was also joint managing editor of The Economic Journal between 2011 and 2017.

Griffith holds both UK and US citizenship.

Biography 
Griffith earned her BA degree magna cum laude in Economics from the University of Massachusetts, Boston in 1985, her MSc degree in econometrics and forecasting from the City of London Polytechnic in 1991, and her PhD from Keele University in 1999. 

Griffith is currently Research Director of the IFS and co-director of the Centre for the Microeconomic Analysis of Public Policy (CPP). She was elected President of the Royal Economic Society from 2019 to 2020. 

She is Professor of Economics at the University of Manchester, a Fellow of the British Academy, a Fellow of the Econometric Society, a Foreign Honorary Member of the American Economic Association and a Research Fellow of CEPR. Rachel won the Birgit Grodal award in 2014, was awarded a CBE in for services to economic policy in 2015 and was made a Dame for services to economic policy and education in 2021. She also served as Deputy Chair of the Economics sub-Panel of the Research Excellence Framework. Currently, she has her second ERC Advanced Grant to study behavior of consumers and firms to see how government policy will impact food markets.

Research

Obesity
Griffith's presidential address to the European Economic Association at the University of Mannheim, Germany entitled "Gluttony and Sloth? Labour Market Nonseparabilities and the Rise in Obesity", reflected her recent research into the relationship between changes in relative food prices and the nutritional quality of households’ shopping baskets.

Corporation tax
In her Royal Economic Society Public Lecture 2015, "Does Starbucks Pay Enough Tax", Griffith argued that corporate tax should be charged like VAT. Griffith stated that the current system of corporate taxation is outdated and taxing corporate profits in the location where value is created is not very meaningful. She suggested taxing profits at the destination of sales rather than at the source of profits would be an improvement. Griffith cited two papers, one by Auerbach and Devereux (2012), the other by Devereux and Vella (2014), in support of her case. Griffith's previous research in this area considers how influential corporate income taxes are in determining where firms choose to legally own intellectual property, i.e. the way in which intellectual property accounts for firms' assets and if they can be used by firms to shift income offshore to reduce their corporate income tax liability.

Honours and Fellowships
 1999 Research Fellow Centre for Economic Policy Research (CEPR)
2011 Elected to the Fellowship of the British Academy (FBA).
2011 - 2014 Fellow of the British Academy, Section Chair
 2014 Brigit Grodal Award.
2015 Distinguished Achievement Medal - Researcher of the Year, University of Manchester Faculty of Humanities
2015 President European Economic Association
2015 The Schumpeter School Award for Business and Economic Analysis, Wuppertal Germany,
2015 Commander of the British Empire (CBE) for services to economic policy
 2016 Elected as Fellow of the Econometric Society.
 2017 Elected a Fellow of the Academy of Social Sciences (FAcSS).
2018-2019 Elected President of the Royal Economic Society
2019-2021 Elected President of the Royal Economic Society

Griffith was appointed Dame Commander of the Order of the British Empire (DBE) in the 2021 New Year Honours for services to economic policy and education.

Bibliography

Thesis

Books
  PREVIEW

Chapters in books
  VIEW ONLINE
  AVAILABLE ONLINE
  IFS WP01/10 PDF
  IFS WP03/01 PDF
  IFS PDF
See also: The Mirrlees Review.

Academic outputs 

 Griffith, Rachel. “Product Market Competition, Creative Destruction and Innovation -.” The Institute for Fiscal Studies, 3 December  2021, ifs.org.uk/publications/15863.
 Griffith, Rachel. “Price Floors and Externality Correction -.” The Institute for Fiscal Studies, 15 November 2021, ifs.org.uk/publications/15827.

Reports and comment 

 Freeman, Harold. “Surplus ACT: A Solution in Sight? -.” The Institute for Fiscal Studies, 1 September 1993, ifs.org.uk/publications/1915.
 Chennells, Lucy. “Taxing Profits in a Changing World -.” The Institute for Fiscal Studies, 1 September 1997, ifs.org.uk/publications/1885.
 Griffith, Rachel. “Productivity and the Role of Government -.” The Institute for Fiscal Studies, 1 November 1998, ifs.org.uk/publications/1886.
 Dias, Monica Costa. “Getting People Back into Work -.” The Institute for Fiscal Studies, 4 May 2020, ifs.org.uk/publications/14829.
 Griffith, Rachel. “Tackling Heavy Drinking through Tax Reform and Minimum Unit Pricing -.” The Institute for Fiscal Studies, 20 November 2020, ifs.org.uk/publications/15183.

Journal articles 
  PDF
 
  PDF
  PDF 
  PDF
  PDF
  PDF
  PDF
  PDF
  PDF
  PDF
  PDF
  PDF
  PDF
  PDF
  PDF
  PDF
  PDF
  PDF
  PDF
  PDF
  PDF The data used in this paper is available here.
  PDF
  PDF
  PDF
  PDF
  PDFThe data used in this paper is available here
  PDF
  PDF
  PDFThe data used in this paper is available here, the do file that recreates the main tables is here
  PDF
  PDF
  PDF
  PDF
  PDF
  PDF
  PDF
  PDF
  PDF
  PDF
  PDF
  PDF
  PDFThe data and Stata do files used in this paper are available here
  PDF
  PDF
  PDF
Griffith, Rachel. “Shopping around: How Households Adjusted Food Spending over the Great Recession -.” The Institute for Fiscal Studies, 1 April 2016, ifs.org.uk/publications/8190.
Griffith, Rachel. “The Importance of Product Reformulation versus Consumer Choice in Improving Diet Quality -.” The Institute for Fiscal Studies, 11 May 2016, ifs.org.uk/publications/8899.
Abramovsky, Laura. “Domestic Effects of Offshoring High-Skilled Jobs: Complementarities in Knowledge Production -.” The Institute for Fiscal Studies, 19 June 2016, ifs.org.uk/publications/8334.
 Griffith, Rachel; Lührmann, Melanie; Lluberas, Rodrigo (June 2016). "Gluttony and sloth? Calories, labour market activity and the rise of obesity", forthcoming in Journal of the European Economic Association
Griffith, Rachel. “Recombinant Innovation and the Boundaries of the Firm -.” The Institute for Fiscal Studies, 1 January 2017, ifs.org.uk/publications/8739.
Dubois, Pierre & Griffith, Rachel & O'Connell, Martin, 2016. "The effects of banning advertising in junk food markets," CEPR Discussion Papers 11316, C.E.P.R. Discussion Papers.
Griffith, Rachel. “Income Effects and the Welfare Consequences of Tax in Differentiated Product Oligopoly -.” The Institute for Fiscal Studies, 17 November 2017, ifs.org.uk/publications/10158.
Griffith, Rachel. “Corrective Taxation and Internalities from Food Consumption -.” The Institute for Fiscal Studies, 20 November 2017, ifs.org.uk/publications/10165.
Griffith, Rachel. “Getting a Healthy Start: The Effectiveness of Targeted -.” The Institute for Fiscal Studies, 1 March 2018, ifs.org.uk/publications/14043.
Griffith, Rachel. “Why Do Retailers Advertise Store Brands Differently across Product Categories? -.” The Institute for Fiscal Studies, 22 March 2019, ifs.org.uk/publications/14081.
Griffith, Rachel. “Tax Design in the Alcohol Market -.” The Institute for Fiscal Studies, 1 April 2019, ifs.org.uk/publications/13826.
 Dias, Monica Costa. “Getting People Back into Work -.” The Institute for Fiscal Studies, 11 May 2020, ifs.org.uk/publications/14851.
 Griffith, Rachel. “What’s on the Menu? Policies to Reduce Young People’s Sugar Consumption -.” The Institute for Fiscal Studies, 21 May 2020, ifs.org.uk/publications/15805.
 Cherchye, Laurens. “A New Year, a New You? Within-Individual Variation in Food Purchases -.” The Institute for Fiscal Studies, 1 June 2020, ifs.org.uk/publications/14866.
 Griffith, Rachel. “The Impact of COVID‐19 on Share Prices in the UK -.” The Institute for Fiscal Studies, 1 June 2020, ifs.org.uk/publications/15034.
 Blundell, Richard. “Could COVID‐19 Infect the Consumer Prices Index? -.” The Institute for Fiscal Studies, 3 June 2020, ifs.org.uk/publications/15033.
 Dubois, Pierre. “How Well Targeted Are Soda Taxes? -.” The Institute for Fiscal Studies, 6 August 2020, ifs.org.uk/publications/14972.

References

External links
 Profile page: Rachel Griffith University of Manchester
 Profile page: Rachel Griffith Institute for Fiscal Studies

1963 births
Academics of the University of Manchester
Alumni of Keele University
Alumni of London Guildhall University
British economists
British women economists
21st-century American economists
20th-century American economists
Dames Commander of the Order of the British Empire
Fellows of the British Academy
Living people
University of Massachusetts Boston alumni
Place of birth missing (living people)
Fellows of the Econometric Society
Fellows of the Academy of Social Sciences
Fellows of the European Economic Association
Journal of Political Economy editors